Ruan Sims  (born 4 February 1982) is an Australian former rugby league and rugby union footballer.

She was a member of the Wallaroos squad at the 2006, and 2010 Rugby World Cup where they finished in third place. She played rugby league for Australia at the 2013 & 2017 Women's Rugby League World Cup and was part of the squad that won the tournament.

Background
She is the older sister of Fijian rugby league internationals Ashton, Tariq and Korbin. She was brought up in a sporting household in Gerringong where Ruan held the gumboot throwing record in 2013. Sims inherits her interest in Rugby from her mother, Jackie Sims. She works for Fire and Rescue NSW.

Playing career
She was part of the Australian Jillaroos squad at the 2015 NRL Auckland Nines.

Sims was the first woman to receive a player contract in the NRL, signed with the Cronulla-Sutherland Sharks.

Since March 2017, Sims works with the ABC Radio Grandstand NRL commentary team, providing commentary both in-box and on the sideline. She is also a regular panellist on Nine Network's 100% Footy.

In April 2018, Sims stepped down as a Dally M Awards judge after casting votes for the Round 7 NRL game between Parrammatta and Manly at ANZ Stadium where she was not in attendance due to other commitments. Judges are required to attend their assigned games.

In June 2018, Sims was announced as one of fifteen marquee signings by the Sydney Roosters women's team which participated in the inaugural NRL Women's Premiership in September 2018.

Sims was awarded the Medal of the Order of Australia in the 2021 Queen's Birthday Honours list.

References

External links

1982 births
Living people
Australia women's international rugby union players
Australian female rugby union players
Australian people of Fijian descent
Australian female rugby league players
Australia women's national rugby league team players
Australian female rugby sevens players
Australian firefighters
Sydney Roosters (NRLW) players
Rugby league props
Rugby league locks
Rugby league players from Sydney
Rugby league second-rows
Ruan
Recipients of the Medal of the Order of Australia
Sportswomen from New South Wales